The 2017 AFL Women's All-Australian team represents the best-performed players of the 2017 AFL Women's season. It was announced on 28 March 2017 as a complete women's Australian rules football team of 22 players, the first and only time that this happened before teams in the AFL Women's were reduced to 21 players in 2018. The team is honorary and does not play any games.

Selection panel
The selection panel for the 2017 AFL Women's All-Australian team consisted of Simon Lethlean, Mark Evans, Josh Vanderloo, Jennie Loughnan, Kevin Sheehan, Peta Searle, Darren Flanigan, Kelli Underwood, Ros Lanigan and Shelley Ware.

Initial squad
The initial 40-woman All-Australian squad was announced on 23 March. Minor premiers  had the most players selected in the initial squad with nine, with players from grand finalists  and Brisbane making up more than one-third of the squad.

Final team
The final team was announced on 28 March. Grand finalists Adelaide and Brisbane had the most representatives with five each, and every team had at least one representative.  captain Daisy Pearce was announced as the All-Australian captain and Adelaide co-captain Erin Phillips was announced as the vice-captain.

Note: the position of coach in the AFL Women's All-Australian team is traditionally awarded to the coach of the premiership-winning team.

References

External links
 AFLW Awards

2017 AFL Women's season